It Happened in Leicester Square is a 1949 British film, written and directed by Geoffrey Benstead. The film stars Harry Tate Jr and Slim Allen as two men from Yorkshire who visit a billiard hall and music hall in London.

The original version was 53 minutes long and was given a "U" Certificate, indicating that it was suitable for children, on 22 March 1949. A re-edited version, some five minutes shorter, was released in 1951 as Hello London.

The film featured appearances from a number of snooker and English billiards players: Joe Davis, Sidney Smith, Thelma Carpenter, Joyce Gardner, Con Stanbury, Herbert Holt and Jackie Rea. David Quinlan described the film as a "Mercifully brief programme-filler."

References

1949 films
British drama films
1949 drama films
British black-and-white films
1940s English-language films
1940s British films